Ivan Igorevich Zatevakhin (born September 7, 1959, Moscow) is a Russian television and radio host, candidate of biological sciences (1988). He is best known as the author and presenter of the popular science program Dialogues about Animals on the TV channel Russia 1.  Four-time nominee for TEFI.

Biography
Born on September 7, 1959 in Moscow in a family of doctors.

Father, Igor Zatevakhin (born 1936), is an academician of the Russian Academy of Medical Sciences, professor, doctor of medical sciences. Mother, Marina Zatevakhina, is an anesthesiologist, an employee of the Scientific Center for Cardiovascular Surgery. Paternal grandfather, Ivan Zatevakhin, is a lieutenant general, former commander of the USSR Airborne Forces.

Bibliography
 Dogs and Us. Trainer's Notes (2015)

References

External links
 Интервью сайту «Зообизнес», 2014.

1959 births
Living people
Scientists from Moscow
Russian television presenters
Moscow State University alumni
Soviet biologists
Russian biologists
Biogeographers
Russian radio personalities
Science communicators
Mass media people from Moscow